Corticirama is a genus of fungi in the family Corticiaceae. The genus contains two species found in Europe.

References

External links

Corticiales
Agaricomycetes genera